Jairo Snaider Labourt (born March 7, 1994) is a Dominican professional baseball pitcher who is a free agent. He previously played in Major League Baseball (MLB) for the Detroit Tigers.

Career

Toronto Blue Jays
Labourt signed with the Toronto Blue Jays as an international free agent for $350,000 in August 2011. He made 12 starts for the Dominican Summer League Blue Jays in 2011, and posted a 0–4 record with a 2.23 earned run average in 36 innings. Labourt played the 2012 season with the Gulf Coast League Blue Jays and went 0–3 with a 3.79 ERA over 12 starts totalling 38 innings. Continuing his rise through the minor league system, he played all of 2013 with the Bluefield Blue Jays and earned his first professional win, finishing the season with a 2–2 record and an impressive 1.92 ERA over 51 innings. Labourt began the 2014 season with the Class-A Lansing Lugnuts, where he struggled in his 6 appearances (3 starts) and pitched to a 6.43 ERA and 11 strikeouts in 14 innings. He was then reassigned to the Low-A Vancouver Canadians and made 15 starts for the team, posting a 5–3 record with a 1.77 ERA and 82 strikeouts in 71 innings. His 1.77 ERA was the lowest mark in the Northwest League, earning him the 2014 ERA title. On October 1, Labourt was named the number 3 prospect in the Northwest League by Baseball America.

Detroit Tigers
On July 30, 2015, the Blue Jays traded Labourt, Daniel Norris, and Matt Boyd to the Detroit Tigers in exchange for David Price. Labourt was assigned to the Dunedin Blue Jays prior to the trade. The Tigers added him to their 40-man roster after the season.

Labourt made his major league debut with the Tigers on September 1, 2017. The Tigers designated him for assignment in February 2018.

On March 2, 2018, Labourt was claimed off waivers by the Cincinnati Reds. Two days later, he was claimed off waivers by the Oakland Athletics before being again designated for assignment on March 12 and then released on March 14. He returned to the Tigers organization when he signed a minor league contract with them on March 28. After being sent to extended spring training, the Tigers released Labourt on May 22, 2018.

Chicago White Sox
On May 29, 2018, Labourt signed a minor league contract with the Chicago White Sox. He was released on July 2.

Tampa Bay Rays
On December 19, 2018, Labourt signed a minor league contract with the Tampa Bay Rays. He was released on March 27, 2019.

Sioux City Explorers
On February 5, 2020, Labourt signed with the Sioux City Explorers of the American Association. However, the team was not selected by the league to compete in the condensed 2020 season due to the COVID-19 pandemic. Labourt was not chosen by another team in the dispersal draft, and therefore became a free agent. On November 10, 2020, Labourt returned to the Explorers, and signed with them for the 2021 season. Labourt was released by the team following the season on November 11, 2021.

References

External links

1994 births
Birmingham Barons players
Bluefield Blue Jays players
Detroit Tigers players
Dominican Republic expatriate baseball players in Canada
Dominican Republic expatriate baseball players in the United States
Dominican Summer League Blue Jays players
Dunedin Blue Jays players
Erie SeaWolves players
Gigantes del Cibao players
Gulf Coast Blue Jays players
Lakeland Flying Tigers players
Lansing Lugnuts players

Living people
Major League Baseball pitchers
Major League Baseball players from the Dominican Republic
Toledo Mud Hens players
Vancouver Canadians players